Buzy is a commune in the Pyrénées-Atlantiques department in southwestern France. Buzy-en-Béarn station has rail connections to Pau, Oloron-Sainte-Marie and Bedous.

See also
 Ossau Valley
 Communes of the Pyrénées-Atlantiques department

References

Communes of Pyrénées-Atlantiques
Pyrénées-Atlantiques communes articles needing translation from French Wikipedia